José Lázaro Robles, best known as Pinga (February 11, 1924 – May 7, 1996) was a Brazilian footballer.

He was born in São Paulo. During his career (1943–1964) he played for Juventus, Portuguesa and Vasco da Gama, where he played 466 matches from 1953 to 1962 and scored 250 goals. Defending the Brazilian team he participated in the Copa America 1953 and the 1954 FIFA World Cup, playing two games and scoring two goals. He died at 72 years old.

1924 births
1996 deaths
Brazilian footballers
Brazil international footballers
CR Vasco da Gama players
Clube Atlético Juventus players
Associação Portuguesa de Desportos players
1954 FIFA World Cup players
Brazilian people of Spanish descent
Association football defenders